Bajul (also Romanized as Bājūl; also known as Bājūl-e Shālū) is a village in Donbaleh Rud-e Shomali Rural District, Dehdez District, Izeh County, Khuzestan Province, Iran. At the 2006 census, its population was 107, in 19 families.

References 

Populated places in Izeh County